Chloe Chivers (born 29 April 1999) is a Welsh footballer who plays as a forward for Swansea City in the Welsh Premier Women's Football League and has appeared for the Wales women's national team.

Career
Chivers has been capped for the Wales national team, appearing for the team during the 2019 FIFA Women's World Cup qualifying cycle.

References

External links
 
 
 

1999 births
Living people
Welsh women's footballers
Wales women's international footballers
Women's association football forwards
Swansea City Ladies F.C. players
Cardiff Met. Ladies F.C. players